Goldwidows: Women in Lesotho 1991, is a 1991 Canadian-German documentary film co-directed by Don Edkins, Ute Holl, Mike Schlomer, Malibusong Matsoso and Thabo Nkubo. The film describes about four "Goldwidows", Basotho women from Lesotho whose husbands work as migrant gold miners in South Africa.

The film has been shot with interviews in Sesotho with English subtitles. The film made its premier in 1990 and distributed with VHS format. The film received mixed reviews from critics. The film made official selection to screen at Leipzig Film Festival and Melbourne Film Festival.

References

External links 
 

1991 films
Canadian documentary films
German documentary films
Women in Lesotho
Mining in Lesotho
1990s English-language films
1990s Canadian films
1990s German films